The Free Indian Party and Elderly Union was a political alliance that participated the elections of 2003.

It consisted out of the Free Indian Party (VIP) and the Elderly Union. The VIP was a political party for people from the Dutch former colonies, Dutch East India and Suriname, that never got a seat in the parliament. The elderly one issue parties, General Elderly Alliance and Union 55+ were very successful in the 1990s, gaining many seats, but after scandals, the elderly lost the confidence among their voters. The two merged into the Ouderenunie.

Political party alliances in the Netherlands
Indo people
Dutch people of Indonesian descent
Pensioners' parties
Dutch people of Surinamese descent
2003 in the Netherlands